"Martha My Dear" is a song by the English rock band the Beatles from their 1968 eponymous double album The Beatles (also known as the "White Album"). Credited to Lennon–McCartney, the song was written solely by Paul McCartney inspired in title only by his Old English Sheepdog, Martha. The song has been interpreted as a veiled reference to his break up with Jane Asher, particularly in the line "don't forget me". "Help yourself to a bit of what is all around you" refers to her alleged affair while away from McCartney with The Old Vic Theatre. 
 It has been covered by several artists, including Slade, Herb Alpert & The Tijuana Brass, Phish, World Party, and Les Boréades de Montréal.

Style and form
The song incorporates elements from pop rock music; it also features a music hall-inspired piano line that recurs throughout the piece, as well as a brass section. The song modulates through several keys.

The song is notated mainly in the key of E major, showing up embellished chords with jazzy sprinkled dissonances. The verse is a syncopated replicate of the first melodic section adding two extra beats, a technique similar to that used later by McCartney in "Two of Us". Though the bridge is in the key of F major, the manner in which it abruptly sets in and exits makes it sound more out-of-the-way than it really is.

Recording
According to Beatles biographers Ian MacDonald and Mark Lewisohn, "Martha My Dear" is one of the few songs by the band in which McCartney played all the instruments (except orchestral instruments played by session musicians). Such a scenario was increasingly common for him during the height of the tensions that marred the sessions for the album. Although George Harrison is known to have recorded a portion of the electric guitar on the final recording, he was not credited.

The song was recorded over two days on 4 and 5 October 1968 at Trident Studios in London. McCartney recorded the piano, drums and vocals on the first day. He was advised to have producer George Martin play the piano solo because it was believed that the solo was beyond McCartney's competency, but McCartney persisted. Martin's brass and string arrangements were overdubbed later that day. On 5 October, McCartney re-recorded his vocals, added handclaps, and overdubbed bass and guitar parts, completing the song that day.

Legacy
Coinciding with the 50th anniversary of its release, Jacob Stolworthy of The Independent listed "Martha My Dear" at number 20 in his ranking of the White Album's 30 tracks. He called the song "one of the album's most unfairly maligned tracks" and "irresistibly charming".

Personnel

The Beatles
 Paul McCartney – double-tracked lead vocals, piano, bass, electric guitar, drums, handclaps, brass and string arrangement

Additional musicians

 Bernard Mille, Dennis McConnell, Lou Sofier, Les Maddox – violins
 Leo Birnbaum, Henry Myerscough – violas
 Reginald Kilby, Frederick Alexander, Peter Halling – cellos
 Leon Calvert – trumpet, flugelhorn
 Stan Reynolds, Ronnie Hughes – trumpets
 Tony Tunstall – French horn
 Ted Barker – trombone
 Alf Reece – tuba

String and brass arrangement by George Martin.

Notes

References

 
 
 
 

The Beatles songs
1968 songs
Song recordings produced by George Martin
Songs written by Lennon–McCartney
Songs published by Northern Songs
Slade songs
Songs about dogs
Music hall songs